2014–15 Vijay Hazare Trophy was the 13th season of the Vijay Hazare Trophy, a List A cricket tournament in India. It was contested by 27 domestic cricket teams of India. Karnataka successfully defended the title after beating Punjab by 156 runs in the final.

Format
The teams are divided across five zonal groups: Central Zone, East Zone, North Zone, South Zone and West Zone. The top two teams from Central Zone, East Zone and South Zone advance directly to the quarterfinals. The top two teams from each of North Zone and West Zone play in the pre-quarterfinals to determine which two teams advance to the quarterfinals. The winner of the knockout tree is declared winner of the tournament.

Group stage

Central Zone

East Zone

North Zone

South Zone

West Zone

Knockout stage

Pre-quarterfinals

Quarterfinals

Semifinals

Final

Statistics

Most runs

Most wickets

References

External links
Tournament home at ESPN Cricinfo

Vijay Hazare Trophy
Vijay Hazare Trophy